Defending champion Novak Djokovic defeated Andy Murray in the final, 7–6(7–3), 4–6, 6–0 to win the men's singles tennis title at the 2015 Miami Open. Djokovic completed his third Sunshine Double with the win, and claimed his fifth Miami Open title.

Seeds
All seeds received a bye into the second round.

  Novak Djokovic (champion)
  Rafael Nadal (third round)
  Andy Murray (final)
  Kei Nishikori (quarterfinals)
  Milos Raonic (fourth round)
  David Ferrer (quarterfinals)
  Stan Wawrinka (third round)
  Tomáš Berdych (semifinals)
  Grigor Dimitrov (third round)
  Feliciano López (second round)
  Jo-Wilfried Tsonga (third round)
  Gilles Simon (fourth round)
  Roberto Bautista Agut (second round)
  Ernests Gulbis (second round)
  Kevin Anderson (fourth round)
  Tommy Robredo (second round)
  Gaël Monfils (fourth round, retired with a hip injury)
  David Goffin (fourth round)
  Pablo Cuevas (second round)
  Ivo Karlović (second round)
  Fabio Fognini (second round)
  John Isner (semifinals)
  Guillermo García López (third round)
  Leonardo Mayer (third round)
  Bernard Tomic (third round)
  Lukáš Rosol (third round)
  Santiago Giraldo (third round)
  Adrian Mannarino (fourth round)
  Fernando Verdasco (fourth round)
  Gilles Müller (second round)
  Jérémy Chardy (third round)
  Viktor Troicki (third round)

Draw

Finals

Top half

Section 1

Section 2

Section 3

Section 4

Bottom half

Section 5

Section 6

Section 7

Section 8

Qualifying

Seeds

 João Souza (first round)
 Tatsuma Ito (first round)
 Benoît Paire (qualifying competition)
 Steve Darcis (qualified)
 Damir Džumhur (qualified)
 Alejandro González (qualifying competition)
 Daniel Gimeno Traver (first round)
 Lukáš Lacko (qualifying competition)
 Tobias Kamke (first round)
 Máximo González (first round)
 Dustin Brown (qualifying competition)
 Filip Krajinović (qualified)
 Robin Haase (qualified)
 James Duckworth (qualified)
 Paul-Henri Mathieu (first round)
 James Ward (first round)
 Andreas Beck (first round)
 Luca Vanni (first round)
 Aljaž Bedene (first round)
 Norbert Gombos (qualifying competition)
 Alejandro Falla (qualified)
 Kenny de Schepper (qualifying competition)
 Facundo Bagnis (first round)
 Thiemo de Bakker (qualifying competition)

Qualifiers

Qualifying draw

First qualifier

Second qualifier

Third qualifier

Fourth qualifier

Fifth qualifier

Sixth qualifier

Seventh qualifier

Eighth qualifier

Ninth qualifier

Tenth qualifier

Eleventh qualifier

Twelfth qualifier

External links
Main Draw
Qualifying Draw

2015 Miami Open
Men in Florida